WLEJ-FM (98.7 MHz) is an FM radio station located in Pleasant Gap, Pennsylvania.

History of the Mill Hall/Pleasant Gap, Pennsylvania 98.7 frequency
98.7 was originally licensed to Mill Hall, Pennsylvania, as WZRZ in December 1995. Engineer Jack (Jay) Kennedy found this available frequency and put it on the air, playing an assortment of formats. In 1997, Sabatino Cupelli purchased the license.

Later on, the station was sold to Forever Broadcasting and the community of license was changed to Pleasant Gap. The station adopted the call letters WLTS-FM in late 2000. During Forever's ownership, the station carried several formats including smooth jazz format under the calls WOJZ, adult rock as WQWK and country as WSGY, a repeater of Froggy 98 from Altoona, Pennsylvania. 98.7 was sold to 2510 Associates who also operated State College stations WBHV-FM (B94.5) and WOWY 97.1. 2510 broadcast a soft AC format programmed by Nick Ferrara using the handle 98.7 Wish-FM and the call letters WWSH. The Wish Wake-Up Show was hosted by State College Radio veteran Ruth O'Brien.

On August 18, 2011, WWSH changed their format to mainstream rock, branded as "Eagle 98.7" under new call letters, WEMR. The Eagle lineup included the "Morning Drive" with Wentz and The Drive Home "Overdrive" with Bickel.

On July 3, 2015, WEMR changed their format to adult album alternative (AAA), branded as "98.7 The Freq", and were granted the WFEQ call letters.

On March 19, 2019, WFEQ moved "The Freq" to online only and began stunting with a loop of Alan Jackson’s "Gone Country" ahead of a country format switch. Between playing of the songs were effects of grunts and something eating a frog, which was a reference to Forever Media’s WFGE. It was expected that this station would become "Bigfoot Country" after stunting.

On March 21, 2019, at noon, WFEQ ended stunting and launched a classic country format, branded as "Bigfoot Country Legends" under new WLEJ call letters, with the first song being "Bigfoot Song" by Gary Nicholson.

On December 30, 2022, it was announced that the format would move to WQWK and WPHB within days.

On January 3, 2023, WLEJ dropped its classic country format and began stunting, simultaneously changing its call sign to WWJL. As this resulted in the station erroneously duplicating a call sign already assigned to another station, the call sign was changed to WLEJ-FM on March 1.

In popular culture
In season 6, episode 26 of The American version of The Office, Michael Scott mentions the radio station "Froggy 98.7".

References

External links

LEJ-FM
Radio stations established in 1997
1997 establishments in Pennsylvania